Birkelse is a village in North Jutland, Denmark. It is located in Jammerbugt Municipality. The town has nearly grown together with the nearby village of Ryå.

History
A train station was located in Birkelse between 1897 and 1969. It was a stop on the Fjerritslev-Nørresundby railroad.

In 2017, the remains of a World War II Messerschmitt fighter plane were found in a field in Birkelse.

External links

References

Cities and towns in the North Jutland Region
Jammerbugt Municipality
Villages in Denmark